Ferndale High School is a public high school in Ferndale, Michigan. It is under the jurisdiction of the Ferndale Public Schools.

History
It was originally Lincoln High School when built in 1921 on the corner of 9 Mile and Livernois Roads.  The current Ferndale High School was built in two phases: "Old Main" was built in 1936 as an addition to Lincoln High School, with the "Alexander" wing built in 1957, the year the high school was renamed; the original 1921 building became a middle school.

Athletics
The Ferndale Eagles are a member of the Oakland Activities Association.  The school colors are currently navy blue and gold. The following MHSAA sanctioned sports are offered:

Baseball (boys)
Basketball (boys & girls)
Boys state champion - 1963, 1966
Bowling (boys & girls)
Cheerleading (girls)
Cross country (boys & girls)
Dance (girls)
Football (boys)

Golf (boys)
Ice hockey (boys)
Soccer (boys & girls)
Softball (girls)
Swimming & diving (boys & girls)
Tennis (boys & girls)
Track & field (boys & girls)
Volleyball (girls)
Wrestling (boys)

Notable people 
James Blanchard, governor of Michigan 1983–1991
Anne Harris, professor and science fiction author
Frank Joranko, football and baseball player and coach; FHS coach 1960–1972
David Kemper, television  writer and producer
Paigion (Kimberly Walker), host of BET's 106 & Park (2012–present)
Rashad Phillips, former professional basketball player
Miriam Shor, film and television actress
Bobby Smith, R&B singer, principal lead singer of the classic Motown/Philly group The Spinners

References

External links 

Official website

Public high schools in Michigan
High schools in Oakland County, Michigan
1921 establishments in Michigan